Richard Ole Ward (May 21, 1909 – May 30, 1966) was a Major League Baseball pitcher who played in 1934 and 1935 with the Chicago Cubs and the St. Louis Cardinals. He batted and threw right-handed. In 2 seasons, he appeared in 4 games, pitching 6 innings, posting a 3.00 earned run average, walking 3 while striking out 1.

He was born in Herrick, South Dakota, and died in Freeland, Washington.

References

External links

1909 births
1966 deaths
Major League Baseball pitchers
Baseball players from Washington (state)
Chicago Cubs players
Saint Martin's Saints baseball players
St. Louis Cardinals players
San Diego Padres (minor league) players
Los Angeles Angels (minor league) players
Rochester Red Wings players
Sacramento Solons players
Seattle Indians players
Wichita Aviators players